The 1972 Sugar Bowl (December) was the 39th edition of the college football bowl game, played at Tulane Stadium in New Orleans, Louisiana, on Sunday, December 31. Part of the 1972–73 bowl game season, it featured the second-ranked Oklahoma Sooners of the Big Eight Conference and the independent #5 Penn State Nittany Lions. It was played for the first time on New Year's Eve, at night, and Oklahoma shut out Penn State, 14–0.

The shutout was the first for Penn State in over six years, and it was their first bowl loss in a decade.

This was the only Sugar Bowl between 1950 and January 1995 without a team from the Southeastern Conference (SEC).

Teams

Oklahoma

The Sooners' only loss was at Colorado.  They broke a three-year losing streak to rival Nebraska.

Penn State

After dropping their opener at Tennessee, Penn State had won ten straight.

Game summary
The game kicked off on New Year's Eve at 8 pm CST. ABC rejected the Sugar Bowl's request for a 7 pm CST kickoff in order to televise The F.B.I. New Orleans and Baton Rouge were blacked out.

Without the future Heisman Trophy winner, the Lions' defense was forced to step up and it held the Sooners explosive Wishbone offense to only 14 points while forcing eight fumbles, recovering five. However, Oklahoma out gained the Lions 543 to 196 yards, 278 to 49 on the ground.

Scoring
First quarter 
No scoring
Second quarter 
Oklahoma – Tinker Owens 27-yard pass from Dave Robertson (Rick Fulcher kick)
Third quarter 
No scoring
Fourth quarter 
Oklahoma – Leon Crosswhite 1-yard run (Fulcher kick)

Statistics
{| class=wikitable style="text-align:center"
! Statistics !! Oklahoma !! Penn State
|-
| align=left|First Downs || 20|| 11
|-
| align=left|Rushes–Yards|| 76–278|| 28–49
|-
| align=left|Yards Passing || 175 || 147
|-
| align=left|Passes || 7–12–0 || 12–31–1
|-
| align=left|Total Yards || 88–453 || 59–196
|-
| align=left|Punts-Average || 8–32.8|| 10–42.9
|-
| align=left|Fumbles–Lost ||8–5|| 6–4
|-
| align=left|Turnovers|| 5 || 5
|-
| align=left|Penalties–Yards ||3–55|| 3–15
|}

Aftermath
Oklahoma was forced to forfeit nine games from the 1972 season after they had used two ineligible freshmen. Despite the forfeit, Penn State refused to accept the win in the 1972 Sugar Bowl, thus the NCAA does not recognize the Penn State forfeit win over Oklahoma. The NCAA also stated that forfeits were not part of the NCAA sanctions levied against the Sooners. The NCAA says it only restricted OU's scholarships, TV appearances, and bowl 

The scandal however, prevented the Sooners from playing in bowl games for two seasons after Chuck Fairbanks's departure to the New England Patriots. Offensive coordinator Barry Switzer, who spearheaded Oklahoma's adoption of the Wishbone formation during the 1970 season, succeeded Fairbanks.

The 1974 Sooners were named national champions by the Associated Press, but could not be ranked by the coaches' poll, due to a rule adopted following the 1973 season by the American Football Coaches Association which prohibited teams on major NCAA probation from the rankings.

The Sooners were allowed to appear on television in 1973, but were banned in 1974 and the 1975 regular season. Oklahoma returned to television with the Orange Bowl on January 1, 1976, when it defeated Michigan  to secure its second consecutive national championship.

Oklahoma did not return to the Sugar Bowl until after the 2003 season, losing in the Bowl Championship Series championship game to LSU 21-14.

Penn State lost the Sugar Bowl twice more in the 1970s to Alabama before breaking through vs. Georgia in the 1983 game to win the national championship for 1982.

References

Sugar Bowl
Sugar Bowl
Oklahoma Sooners football bowl games
Penn State Nittany Lions football bowl games
Sugar Bowl
Sugar Bowl